Hill-Miller Municipal Airport  is a city-owned public airport  southwest of the central business district of Atlanta, Cass County, Texas, United States. Most U.S. airports use the same three-letter location identifier for the FAA and IATA, but Hall-Miller Municipal Airport is assigned ATA by the FAA and has no IATA designation. IATA assigned ATA to Comandante FAP Germán Arias Graziani Airport in Anta, Ancash Region, Peru. 

The airport is used solely for general aviation purposes.

Facilities 
 Runway 05/23: 3,800 x 60 ft. (1,158 x 18 m), Surface: Asphalt
 Runway 15/33: 2,264 x 75 ft. (690 x 23 m), Surface: Turf
The Texas Department of Transportation lists the length of Runway 15/33 as 2,463 ft (751 m).

For the year ending 9 June 2016, the airport had 20,000 aircraft operations, averaging 55 per day: 100% general aviation. 39 aircraft were then based at this airport: 95% single-engine, 3%  multi-engine, and 3% ultralight.

Accidents and incidents 
 19 January 1997: A Mahan Starduster II, registration number N45227, was on approach when it lost engine power and the pilot performed a forced landing on a highway; the aircraft collided with a tree and came to rest in a pasture, suffering substantial damage, with the single passenger suffered serious injuries and the pilot suffered minor injuries. The pilot reported that he believed that the throttle fell back to the idle position due to a loose clamp; an FAA inspector "concluded that the power loss was due to failure of the engine throttle control cable." The accident was attributed to "improper maintenance by unknown person(s), which resulted in the failure of the throttle cable and a substantial loss of engine power. A factor relating to the accident was: the lack of suitable terrain for the forced landing."

References 
Notes

Citations

External links 
  at Texas DOT Airport Directory

Airports in Texas
Transportation in Cass County, Texas